Brinkhaus is a surname. Notable people with the surname include: 

Horst Brinkhaus, German professor of Indology
Ralph Brinkhaus (born 1968), German politician

See also
Brinkhuis